Laura Emma Jackson (born 30 April 1986) is an English television presenter and columnist. She presented the quiz shows Ready or Not on BBC One and Take Me Out: The Gossip on ITV2.

Biography

Jackson was born in Huddersfield,  West Yorkshire, and raised in Kirkburton. She has four siblings. She was educated at Shelley College.

Jackson was spotted while working as a receptionist at Shoreditch House, a members club and hotel in London. She began her career presenting the T4 music show Freshly Squeezed alongside Nick Grimshaw, and went on to present on Take Me Out: The Gossip on ITV2, This Morning on ITV, The Clothes Show  on BBC One and Big Brother's Little Brother on Channel 4. In 2018, she hosted Ready or Not on BBC One.

She runs an East London supper club, Jackson&Levine, with Alice Levine.  Jackson and Levine are food columnists for Elle, Marie Claire and Company magazine, and have published a cookbook. They also have a homeware line with Habitat.

Jackson married photographer Jonathan Gorrigan in 2017. They had their first child, a daughter named Sidney Frances, in May 2019.

Bibliography

References

External links 
 
 

1986 births
Living people
People from Kirkburton
English television presenters
English columnists
Women cookbook writers
British women writers
British food writers
Television personalities from West Yorkshire